Manar Mustafa Ahmad Fraij (born 29 April 1998) is a Jordanian football coach and former player who is the assistant coach of the Jordan women's national team. She played as a forward internationally for Jordan.

Managerial career
In February 2022, Fraij was appointed assistant coach to David Nascimento of the Jordan women's national team.

References

External links
 
 
 
 

1998 births
Living people
Sportspeople from Amman
Jordanian women's footballers
Women's association football forwards
Jordan women's international footballers
Asian Games competitors for Jordan
Footballers at the 2006 Asian Games
Jordanian football managers
Female association football managers
Women's association football managers
21st-century Jordanian women